Marcio Leite Cerquinho (born June 16, 1980, in Manaus) is a Brazilian curler and curling coach.

Career
In 2017 and 2018, Cerquinho participated in the World Mixed Doubles Curling Championship, placing 28th in 2017 and 17th in 2018.  In 2016 and 2017, he participated in the Brazilian Mixed Doubles Championship, where he took second place and first place on both occasions.

Cerquinho also participated in the 2018 Americas Challenge (January) where the Brazilian Curling Team played against Glenn Howard's in a best-of-five series that occurred parallel to the 2018 Continental Cup of Curling.

Cerquinho and his partner Aline Santos missed a spot in the playoffs of the 2018 World Mixed Doubles Curling Championship losing on the LSD (Last Stone Draw) to Finland by 2.48 cm.

Cerquinho and partner Luciana Barrella placed 26th at the 2019 World Mixed Doubles Curling Championship.

Teams

Men's

Mixed

Mixed doubles

Record as a coach of national teams

Personal life
Cerquinho is a Software developer. He was employed at the Vancouver Curling Club until October 2019.

He also built the first 3 sheet Curling Rink in Latin America, located in São Paulo in March 2020 called Arena Ice Brasil.

Cerquinho is currently facing three child sex charges for an incident in New Westminster, British Columbia in 2021. Cerquinho denies any wrongdoing.

References

External links
 
 Marcio Cerquinho | Confederacao Brasileira de Deportos No Gelo 

1980 births
Living people
People from Manaus
Brazilian male curlers
Brazilian curling champions
Curlers from Vancouver
Curling ice makers
Brazilian curling coaches
Brazilian expatriate sportspeople in Canada
Sportspeople from Amazonas (Brazilian state)